John William Brown (1842–1928) was an English painter and stained glass designer.  He was employed by Morris & Co. and later by James Powell and Sons, before he became a freelance designer, when he continued to undertake commissions for Powell's.  His major works include the Lady Chapel windows and the east window of Liverpool Cathedral.

Biography 
Brown was born in Newcastle upon Tyne in 1842, and he trained as an artist under William Bell Scott, a friend of William Morris.  In the late 1860s he moved to London and worked with Morris & Co.  In 1874 he joined James Powell and Sons where he became a stained glass designer.  He was also a painter whose works were in the style of the Aesthetic movement. Brown left Powell's in 1886 to work freelance, but he continued to be their preferred designer for important projects.  He continued to produce designs for Powell's up to 1923, but in the later part of his career most of his work was carried out for Henry Holiday.  Towards the end of his life his eyesight deteriorated, and he died in 1928.

Works

Liverpool Cathedral 
In 1907 the competition to design the first stained glass windows for Liverpool Cathedral was won by Powell's, and Brown was commissioned to design them.  The first part of the cathedral to be built was the Lady Chapel and, as the chapel was dedicated to St Mary, the designs reflect the part that women have played in the history of Christianity.  On the staircase leading from the chapel to the main body of the cathedral are windows known as the 'Noble Women' windows that honour the contribution of women to society.  In 1921 Brown went on to design the large east window of the cathedral, which rises above its reredos.  The design of the window is based on the theme of the Te Deum laudamus, with the risen Christ at the top, and below are four windows each representing one of the communities praising God.

Elsewhere 
Other designs by Brown in Northwest England include windows in Chester Cathedral (1921) and its Refectory (c. 1913), and opus sectile panels in Blackburn Museum and Art Gallery.  He also designed windows in churches in Sussex.

Notes

References 
Citations

Sources

External links 

1842 births
1928 deaths
19th-century English painters
20th-century English painters
Artists from Newcastle upon Tyne
British stained glass artists and manufacturers
English male painters
20th-century English male artists
19th-century English male artists